Joel Samuel Paris (born 11 December 1992) is an Australian cricketer, currently contracted to Western Australia and the Hobart Hurricanes domestically.

Career
From Perth, Paris represented Western Australia at under-19 level, making his debut while aged only 16. He attended Scotch College in Perth. A left-arm fast bowler, he went on to play a total of eight Youth One Day International (ODI) matches for the Australian national under-19 cricket team, including at the 2012 ICC Under-19 World Cup, where he took six wickets.

For the 2011–12 season, Paris received a rookie contract with the Western Australian Cricket Association (WACA), which was maintained for the following season. Having missed portions of the previous season due to a stress fracture in his foot, he debuted at state level towards the end of the 2012–13 edition of the Ryobi One-Day Cup, taking 1/35 against New South Wales. Signed to the Perth Scorchers for the 2013–14 season, he debuted for the team at the 2013 edition of the Champions League Twenty20, taking two wickets from four matches (one of which was abandoned due to rain). These wickets each came in the match against the Otago Volts, which was his Twenty20 debut. He took wickets with his first two balls, with his first over a double-wicket maiden, but conceded 50 runs from his final three overs to finish with 2/50 for the match. At grade cricket level, Paris plays for Claremont–Nedlands.

He made his One Day International debut for Australia against India on 12 January 2016. He wears the no. 11 jersey, a number previously worn by Glenn McGrath.

Career best performances

References

External links

1992 births
Australian cricketers
Australia One Day International cricketers
Living people
Cricketers from Perth, Western Australia
Western Australia cricketers
Perth Scorchers cricketers
Hobart Hurricanes cricketers
Sportsmen from Western Australia
Delhi Capitals cricketers